The 2014–15 North Florida Ospreys women's basketball team represented the University of North Florida in the 2014–15 NCAA Division I women's basketball season. The Ospreys were coached by twenty-third year head coach Mary Tappmeyer and were members of the Atlantic Sun Conference. They finished the season 11–19, 2–12 in A-Sun play for a last place finish. They were defeated in the quarterfinals of the 2015 Atlantic Sun women's basketball tournament to Florida Gulf Coast.

Media
All home games and conference road games were shown on ESPN3 or A-Sun.TV.

Roster

Schedule

|-
!colspan=9 style="background:#031B49; color:white;"|Regular Season

|-
!colspan=9 style="background:#031B49; color:white;"|Atlantic Sun Tournament

See also
 2014–15 North Florida Ospreys men's basketball team

References

North Florida
North Florida Ospreys women's basketball seasons
North Florida
North Florida